Plectrosternus is a genus of moderate to large sized click beetles.

Gallery

See also 
 List of click beetles of India

References 

 Candèze, E. (1863). Monographie des Élatérides. Vol. 4. Memoires de la Société Royale des Sciences de Liége 17, 534 pp., 6 pls. page 493. plate 6; fig. 6.
 Schwarz, O. (1907a). Coleoptera Fam. Elateridae. Fascicule 46C.pp. 225–370 pls 1–6 in Wytsman, P. (ed.) Genera Insectorum  Bruxelles: P. Wytsman.

Elateridae genera
Dendrometrinae